was a female Japanese murderer known for killing a man and being the last woman in Japan to be put to death by beheading. She was also suspected of poisoning her husband. The movie Dokufu Oden Takahashi is based on her life. Director Shōgorō Nishimura's Roman porno film  (1983) also depicts Takahashi.

References

External links
 

1848 births
1879 deaths
19th-century Japanese criminals
19th-century Japanese women
Executed Japanese people
Japanese female murderers
19th-century executions by Japan
Executed Japanese women
People executed for murder
People convicted of murder by Japan
Japanese people convicted of murder
People executed by Japan by decapitation